The Tour du Belvédère is a 20 metre tall observation tower located on Belvédère mountain near Mulhouse in Alsace, France. Tour du Belvédère was designed by Ph. Ant. Fauler, built in 1898 and is reminiscent of the Eiffel Tower.

External links
 
 http://www.skyscraperpage.com/diagrams/?b47495

See also
 List of towers

Towers completed in 1898
Observation towers in France
Buildings and structures in Haut-Rhin
Tourist attractions in Haut-Rhin